Robot Combat League (RCL) is a television show on the Syfy network about robot fighting competitions. On the show, teams use exosuits to control fighting robots. The series is hosted by Chris Jericho, and premiered on February 26, 2013 at 10 PM EST.

Overview
Each weekly show features tournament competitions between 8-foot, 1000-pound humanoid robots controlled by human competitors, one robo-jockey and one robo-tech per team.  The series features twelve teams of individuals from diverse backgrounds. Each team is paired with a robot that they control using an exo-suit that directs its movements. Each fight goes three rounds, and the winning team advances. There are 12 total robots.

The robots range from an axe-headed laser eyed warrior to a robot made of plexiglass and a roll cage.

The robots and the suits used to control them were created by robotics expert Mark Setrakian.

Rules

: In the season one finale's championship fight there were five two-minute rounds, with the winner being the first team that won three rounds out of the five.

Competitors
Each team consists of a uniquely themed robot and two human controllers.

One human is the "Robo-Jockey," controlling the robot's arms and torso while standing via an exosuit-like harness strapped to his or her back and arms.
The other human is the "Robo-Tech," seated in a chair while using two joysticks to control the robot's feet and any other unique parts, such as the movable axe "head" on A.X.E.

Each robot is powered by hydraulic and pneumatic actuators. Each robot moves on two feet, stabilized by a bar that attaches at the back of the robot, above the legs. The robots each have six actuators at the waist, and several more in each arm. The robots are all styled and painted to be unique and distinct from each other. This unique styling is especially expressed in the different types and designs of armor that cover each robot, from sheet steel, to steel pipe roll cages, to carbon fibre, to leather. The robots' hands are also all individually styled, and can be quickly detached to facilitate repairs between rounds, or swapped out for weapon attachments.
Several cameras may be mounted on each robot by the show staff to capture show footage, but none of the camera images were used to help control of the robot.

The robots are controlled by the "Robo-Jockey" and "Robo-Tech" via direct line-of-sight, from two raised platforms at either end of the arena.

The initial team seed order was determined by a timed challenge in the first episode.

Episodes

Overview

Season 1 (2013)

Season One teams and competition results

Robots

Human competitors

Tournament results

Season One team status

Semi-finals match-ups

Championship match-up

See also
 Real Steel – a science fiction sports drama film, starring Hugh Jackman, where in the year 2020 human boxers have been replaced by robot boxers
 Robot Jox – a science fiction sports drama film about giant mechanical machines, that fight international battles in a dystopian post-apocalyptic world, piloted by "Robot Jockeys" who represent their respective nations
 Robot Wars
 BattleBots
 Robot Fighting League
 RoboGames
 Combots
 Robo One
 Robot competition
 Rockem Sockem Robots

References

2013 American television series debuts
Syfy original programming
Television series about robots
2013 American television series endings